Pseudokineococcus lusitanus is a Gram-positive, coccus-shaped and motile bacterium from the genus of Pseudokineococcus which has been isolated from a roof tile from Oporto in Portugal.

References

Bacteria described in 2011
Actinomycetia